The East Ringwood Football Club is an Australian rules football club located in Ringwood, Victoria. The club is affiliated in Division 1 of the Eastern Football League.

History
Club was formed in 1929  and played in the Ringwood District Football Association until WWII.
After the war it played in the Croydon FL and later was founding member of the Eastern Football League.

Premierships
1941, 1947, 1953, 1954, 1957, 1961, 1966, 1974, 1984, 2002, 2022

VFL/AFL players
 Shane Biggs - 
 Daniel McStay - 
 Leigh Osborne -

References

External links
  Official club website
 Official Eastern Football League site

Eastern Football League (Australia) clubs
Australian rules football clubs established in 1929
1929 establishments in Australia
Sport in the City of Maroondah